Morphosis Architects is an interdisciplinary architectural and design practice based in Los Angeles and New York City.

History
The firm was informally founded in 1972 by Michael Brickler, Thom Mayne, Livio Santini and James Stafford. Michael Rotondi joined the practice in 1975 and remained a principal until 1991. Writing in 1989, Boston Globe architecture critic Robert Campbell called Morphosis "one of the country's most interesting" architecture firms, and described its very physical, materials-focused design style as "look[ing] as if it might hurt you."

Principals

Born in Connecticut, Thom Mayne (b. 1944) studied architecture at the University of Southern California and Harvard Graduate School of Design. He was a founding member of the Southern California Institute of Architecture (SCI-Arc) in 1972, and has held faculty positions at the Southern California Institute of Architecture, California Polytechnic State University, Pomona, and the University of California, Los Angeles. Mayne was the recipient of the Pritzker Architecture Prize in 2005.

Michael Rotondi (b. 1949) was one of 50 students who attended SCI-Arc when it started in 1972. He became the director of the school in 1987, and held that position until 1997. Rotondi's career awards include the 2009 AIA/LA Gold Medal and the 2014 Richard J. Neutra Medal from Cal Poly Pomona College of Environmental Design.

Projects
Notable works by the firm include:

 The Lawrence Residence, 1981–1984, in Hermosa Beach, California. The home has been described as "two stylistically different structures that collide at a slight angle on their narrow lot...".
 Diamond Ranch High School near Pomona, California, which first opened in 1997.
 The San Francisco Federal Building, which opened in 2007 and became the first federal building to achieve LEED certification.
 The Bill & Melinda Gates Hall at Cornell University, 2014. The $60 million building houses Cornell's Computing and Information Science (CIS) program.
 Bloomberg Center at Cornell Tech, Sep. 13, 2017, on Roosevelt Island, New York.  The $115 million, five-story, "net-zero energy" building uses the power it creates on its own.
 Korean American National Museum, 2020-, in Los Angeles, California

Awards
Mayne and Rotondi received numerous awards for their work in Morphosis, including 11 American Institute of Architects awards and 12 from Progressive Architecture. In 1992, the American Academy and Institute of Arts and Letters awarded them the Academy-Institute Award in Architecture.

Morphosis has been recognized with more than 190 local, national and international awards, including nine for the design of the Emerson College Los Angeles campus and 16 for the Perot Museum of Nature and Science. These include the 2014 Los Angeles Architecture Awards Grand Prize, presented by the Los Angeles Business Council, for designing the campus of Emerson College in Hollywood.

References

External links
 

Architecture firms based in California
Architecture firms based in New York City